The Dana duckbill eel (Nessorhamphus danae) is an eel in the family Derichthyidae (longneck eels). It was described by Johannes Schmidt in 1931. It is a marine, deep water-dwelling eel which is known from throughout the Atlantic, Pacific, and Indian Ocean, including Australia, Brazil, Benin, Bangladesh, Cameroon, Cambodia, China, Ghana, Pakistan, Côte d'Ivoire, Guinea, India, Mozambique, Guinea-Bissau, Indonesia, Liberia, Malaysia, Kenya, Mauritania, Myanmar, Nigeria, Papua New Guinea, Senegal, Sierra Leone, the Philippines, Somalia, South Africa, Tanzania, Sri Lanka, Thailand, Togo, the Hawaiian Islands, USA; Yemen, and Vietnam. Males can reach a maximum total length of 30 centimetres.

Due to the widespread distribution of the Dana duckbill eel, as well as its deep-water nature and the subsequent perceived lack of threats, the IUCN redlist currently lists the species as Least Concern.

References

Derichthyidae
Taxa named by Johannes Schmidt (biologist)
Fish described in 1931